Benjamin Alexandro "Ben" Agosto (born January 15, 1982) is an American ice dancer. With  partner Tanith Belbin, Agosto is the 2006 Olympic silver medalist, a four-time World medalist, the 2004–2006 Four Continents champion, and 2004–2008 U.S. champion.

Personal life
Benjamin Agosto was born January 15, 1982, in Chicago, Illinois, and raised in Northbrook, Illinois. He is the son of a Puerto Rican father and a Jewish mother whose family has roots in Romania and Russia. Agosto attended grade school at the Chicago Waldorf School, then spent two years at Glenbrook North High School, and graduated with honors from Michigan's Groves High School in June 2000. He played in a high school jazz band.

Agosto lived in Detroit, Michigan, from June 1998 and then Canton, Michigan, before moving to Aston, Pennsylvania, in the summer of 2008. He relocated to Lacey, Washington, in September 2010 and then to Scottsdale, Arizona, in 2014.

Career

Early years 
Agosto started skating at age six, after receiving a pair of ice skates for his birthday, and started ice dancing at about age 12. Early in his career, he was coached by Susie Wynne. He skated with Katie Hill from 1995 to 1998, competing with her on the novice and junior levels, including internationally. They skated out of Midwestern Section. When that partnership ended, Agosto moved from Chicago to Michigan in 1998 in order to train under Igor Shpilband.

Partnership with Belbin 
In 1998, Agosto's coach partnered him with Canadian Tanith Belbin. In the 1999–2000 season, they won a pair of medals on the ISU Junior Grand Prix series and finished 4th at the JGP Final. They went on to win the U.S. junior national title and then took the bronze medal at the 2000 World Junior Championships. In 2000–2001, Belbin/Agosto competed again on the JGP series, taking gold in all three of their events including the Final. They appeared on the senior level at the 2001 U.S. Championships and won the silver medal, qualifying them for their first senior World Championships, where they finished 17th.

In 2001–2002, Belbin/Agosto made their senior Grand Prix debut and won another silver medal at the U.S. Championships, which would have qualified them for the 2002 Winter Olympics if Belbin had been an American citizen. Instead, Belbin/Agosto were sent to all the other ISU Championships for which they were eligible: Four Continents, Junior Worlds, and Worlds. They won the 2002 World Junior Championships, completing their set of medals from that event. Following that season, Agosto aged out of juniors.

Belbin/Agosto won the 2004 U.S. national title and would go on to repeat four times. At Nationals in 2005, the last year of the 6.0 system, they received straight perfect sixes for presentation in their free dance. Of the 30 6.0s given out in ice dance at U.S. Nationals, Belbin/Agosto have 14 of them. Their total 6.0 count at the U.S. Championships is second only to Michelle Kwan (38).

In February 2005, Belbin/Agosto organized and performed in their own figure skating benefit show, Skate Aid for Tsunami Relief, which raised more than $37,000 for Red Cross relief efforts.

Belbin/Agosto won the silver medal at the 2005 World Championships. Their silver medal combined with the placement of the other American team earned the United States three spots to the Olympics in ice dance, the first time this had happened since 1984. By a special act of Congress that passed on December 28, 2005, which President Bush signed on New Year's Eve, 2005, Belbin became a naturalized citizen of the US, making her able to compete for the United States at the 2006 Winter Olympics. Belbin/Agosto went on to win the Olympic silver medal in ice dance on February 20, 2006. They were the first American ice dance team since 1976, the first year ice dancing was contested at the Olympics, to win an Olympic medal.

Belbin/Agosto began the 2006–2007 season with a free dance called That's Entertainment but arrived at Nationals with a new program to the music of Amelie. They won gold at Nationals, the silver medal at Four Continents, and the bronze at Worlds.

In 2007–2008, they won gold medals at both Skate America and Cup of China which qualified them for the Grand Prix Final, where they took the silver medal. They won their 5th national title and then placed 4th at the 2008 Worlds after a fall by Belbin in the compulsory dance. Belbin/Agosto were regular cast members of the Champions on Ice tour from 2004 until COI went out of business following the 2007 season. They were guest stars on part of the 2008 Stars on Ice tour.

In April 2008, Belbin/Agosto left Igor Shpilband and began working with the married coaching team of Natalia Linichuk and Gennadi Karponosov at the Ice Works Skating Complex in Aston, Pennsylvania. In addition to teaching different technique, Linichuk advised Belbin to gain 10 pounds and develop some muscles in order to skate faster and more fluidly. This also gave Belbin more core strength to hold her positions better, thus making lifts easier for Agosto.

Belbin/Agosto began the 2008–2009 season at the 2008 Skate America and 2008 Cup of China, winning silver at both competitions. They withdrew from the 2008–2009 ISU Grand Prix Final after the original dance due to a back injury to Agosto. They withdrew from the 2009 U.S. Championships before the event began to due Agosto's injury. They were named to the team to the 2009 World Championships. At Worlds, they won the original dance and placed second in the compulsory and free dances to win the silver medal overall.

Belbin/Agosto won both their Grand Prix events in the 2009-10 season: the 2009 Cup of China and the 2009 Skate America. They withdrew from the Grand Prix Final for medical reasons. At the 2010 U.S. Championships, they were unable to reclaim their national title, finishing second behind Meryl Davis and Charlie White. Belbin/Agosto were nominated to represent the United States at the 2010 Winter Olympics. They finished 4th in the Olympic ice dancing event. They did not compete at the 2010 World Championships.

On June 10, 2010, Belbin and Agosto announced their retirement from eligible skating. Since then they have toured professionally in ice shows.

On December 15, 2015, U.S. Figure Skating announced Belbin and Agosto would be members of the U.S. Figure Skating Hall of Fame Class of 2016. The induction ceremony was held on January 22, 2016, at the 2016 U.S. Figure Skating Championships.

Later career 
Agosto works as a coach and choreographer. He has choreographed for three Disney on Ice shows and in 2014, he became the director of ice dance at the Ice Den in Scottsdale, Arizona.

Also Agosto worked as a voice actor for a video game in 2006, and expressed an interest in continuing in the field. He has performed on television as a spokesperson for the United States Census.

Programs 
(with Belbin)

Competitive highlights

With Belbin

With Hill

See also

List of Puerto Ricans - Sports
List of select Jewish figure skaters

References

External links

 
 
 
 
 
 

American male ice dancers
Figure skaters at the 2006 Winter Olympics
Figure skaters at the 2010 Winter Olympics
Living people
1982 births
Olympic silver medalists for the United States in figure skating
Jewish American sportspeople
American people of Puerto Rican descent
American people of Romanian-Jewish descent
American people of Russian-Jewish descent
Figure skaters from Chicago
Glenbrook North High School alumni
People from Canton, Michigan
Waldorf school alumni
Olympic medalists in figure skating
People from Lacey, Washington
World Figure Skating Championships medalists
Four Continents Figure Skating Championships medalists
World Junior Figure Skating Championships medalists
Medalists at the 2006 Winter Olympics
Competitors at the 2001 Goodwill Games